Ugorelets is a village in the municipality of Sevlievo, in Gabrovo Province, in northern central Bulgaria.

Honours
Ugorelets Point in Antarctica is named after the village of Ugorelets.

References

Villages in Gabrovo Province